{|

{{Infobox ship career
|Hide header=
|Ship country=United States
|Ship flag=
|Ship name=USS Arroyo
|Ship namesake=Arroyo, a Spanish word for creek which may also be applied to a small, frequently dry gully or channel carved by water (previous name retained)
|Ship owner=
|Ship operator=
|Ship registry=
|Ship route=
|Ship ordered=
|Ship awarded=
|Ship builder=Luders Marine Construction Company, Stamford, Connecticut
|Ship original cost=
|Ship yard number=
|Ship way number=
|Ship laid down=
|Ship launched=
|Ship sponsor=
|Ship christened=
|Ship completed=1913
|Ship acquired=21 April 1917
|Ship commissioned=25 June 1917
|Ship decommissioned=2 January 1918
}}

|}
USS Arroyo (SP-197) was a U.S. Navy patrol vessel in commission from 1917 to 1918.Arroyo was built as a civilian motorboat of the same name in 1913 by the Luders Marine Construction Company at Stamford, Connecticut. The U.S. Navy leased her for one dollar from her owner, Mr. A. M. Huntington, on 21 April 1917 for World War I service as a patrol vessel. She was commissioned as USS Arroyo (SP-197) at the New York Navy Yard at Brooklyn, New York, on 25 June 1917.Arroyo was assigned to the Naval Coast Defense Reserve of the 3rd Naval District and attached to the radio office at the New York Navy Yard. She was laid up at the Marine Basin, New York, on 2 January 1918.Arroyo was recommissioned on 18 April 1918. She departed New York City on 31 May 1918 bound for the Great Lakes. There she worked with the section patrol, operating out of Detroit and St. Clair, Michigan.Arroyo'' returned to New York City just after the armistice with Germany of 11 November 1918 that ended World War I. On 16 December 1918, she was decommissioned and returned to her owner. Her name was stricken from the Navy Directory that same day.

References

Department of the Navy: Navy History and Heritage Command: Online Library of Selected Images: U.S. Navy Ships: USS Arroyo (SP-197), 1917-1918
NavSource Online: Section Patrol Craft Photo Archive: Arroyo (SP 197)

Patrol vessels of the United States Navy
World War I patrol vessels of the United States
Great Lakes ships
Ships built in Stamford, Connecticut
1913 ships